El Salvador sent a delegation to compete in the 2020 Summer Paralympics in Tokyo in Japan originally scheduled to take place in 2020 but postponed to 23 July to 8 August 2021 because of the COVID-19 pandemic. This was the country's sixth successive appearance in the Summer Paralympics since debuting at the 2000 Summer Paralympics.

Medalists

Competitors

Powerlifting

See also
 El Salvador at the 2020 Summer Olympics

References

Nations at the 2020 Summer Paralympics
2020
2021 in Salvadoran sport